Gibberula leibovitzae is a species of sea snail, a marine gastropod mollusk, in the family Cystiscidae. It is named after Annie Leibovitz.

Description
The length of the shell attains 3.5 mm.

Distribution
This marine species occurs in Guadeloupe.

References

leibovitzae
Gastropods described in 2015